The 1969 National Challenge Cup was the 56th edition of the United States Soccer Football Association's annual open soccer championship.  The Greek American AA team defeated the Montebello Armenians in the final game. As a result, Greek American Atlas won their third consecutive National Cup title. The feat would not be repeated until 2011, when Seattle Sounders defeated Chicago Fire.

Bracket

References

External links
 1969 U.S. Open Cup – TheCup.us

Lamar Hunt U.S. Open Cup
U.S. Open Cup